Sahak "Hak" Parparyan (born 4 September 1988) is an Armenian heavyweight-cruiserweight kickboxer, who is sometimes referred to as Sahak "Hak" Avetisyan. He is currently fighting out of the Van Os Gym in Alkmaar, Netherlands where he trains with fellow Armenian-born fighter and K-1 MAX stalwart Gago Drago. Sahak is a former W.F.C.A. European and World Champion' and he is a former It's Showtime 85MAX world champion.

Biography and career
Fighting out of Alkmaar, Sahak made his debut with the It's Showtime organization in 2006, winning a C-Klass bout by decision in his home town. In 2010 after almost exclusively fighting on the Dutch circuit, Sahak headed to Paris to face Abdarhmane Coulibaly for the W.P.M.F. European title, losing a decision to the home fighter after five rounds. He would make up for this disappointment the next year, winning the W.F.C.A. world title by KO'ing Yassin Boudrouz in the fourth round of their match in Belgium. In May 2011, Sahak faced Amir Zeyada for the It's Showtime 85MAX world title, vacated by Melvin Manhoef. After five rounds the Armenian was the new world champion, taking the belt by majority decision in what was one of the most exciting world title fights the organization has ever seen.

Parparyan made his first title defense against English-American Andrew Tate. He won the fight via unanimous decision 48–47, 49–46, 49–47, 48–47, and 49–48.

He defeated Jason Wilnis via decision at Iron Ring on September 15, 2012, in Alkmaar, Netherlands.

He was scheduled to defend his title against Alex Pereira at It's Showtime 60 in São Paulo, Brazil on November 10, 2012. However, he was forced to pull out of the fight due to visa issues and was replaced by former foe Jason Wilnis.

In late 2012, he competed on the third season of the Enfusion reality television show which culminated with a four-man tournament at Enfusion 3: Trial of the Gladiators on December 2, 2012, in Ljubljana, Slovenia where Parparyan lost to Franci Grajš by unanimous decision in the semi-finals.

Parparyan fought to a draw with César Córdoba at Enfusion Live: Barcelona in Barcelona, Spain on March 9, 2012. Córdoba was more dominant over the first two rounds, but Parparyan scored a knockdown with right overhand in the third and final round to earn himself a draw.

He lost to Artem Levin via an extension round decision at Glory 7: Milan in Milan, Italy on April 20, 2013.

He was TKO'd in round one by eventual champion Pavel Zhuravlev in the semi-finals of the -93 kg/205 lb tournament at Legend 2: Invasion in Moscow, Russia on November 9, 2013. This was the first time that Parparyan was stopped in a fight.

He competed in the Glory 14: Zagreb - Middleweight Contendership Tournament in Zagreb, Croatia on March 8, 2014, beating Jason Wilnis by split decision in the semi-finals before losing to Alex Pereira by majority decision in the final.

Titles
2014 Glory Middleweight Contender Tournament Runner-up
2011 It's Showtime 85MAX World champion -85 kg
2010 W.F.C.A. World champion -86.5 kg
W.F.C.A. European champion -82.5 kg

Kickboxing record

|-
|-  bgcolor="FFBBBB" 
| 2017-10-29 || Loss ||align=left| Andrei Stoica || WFL: Manhoef vs. Bonjasky, Final 16 || Almere, Netherlands || Decision (unanimous)  || 3 || 3:00
|-
|-  bgcolor="FFBBBB"
| 2015-09-19 || Loss ||align=left| Maxim Vorovski || Xplosion Fight Series || Tallinn, Estonia || Ext. R. Decision  || 4 || 3:00
|-
|-  bgcolor="FFBBBB"
| 2015-05-16 || Loss ||align=left| Ertugrul Bayrak || A1 World Combat Cup, Semi Finals || Eindhoven, Netherlands || Decision  || 3 || 3:00
|-
|-  bgcolor="CCFFCC"
| 2015-05-16 || Win ||align=left| Masoud Rahimi || A1 World Combat Cup, Quarter Finals || Eindhoven, Netherlands || Decision  || 3 || 3:00
|-
|-  bgcolor= "#FFBBBB"
| 2014-03-08 ||Loss ||align=left| Alex Pereira || Glory 14: Zagreb - Middleweight Contender Tournament, Final || Zagreb, Croatia ||Decision (majority) || 3 || 3:00
|-
! style=background:white colspan=9 |
|-
|-  bgcolor="#CCFFCC"
| 2014-03-08 || Win||align=left|  Jason Wilnis || Glory 14: Zagreb - Middleweight Contender Tournament, Semi Finals || Zagreb, Croatia || Decision (split) ||3 ||3:00
|-
|-  bgcolor="#FFBBBB"
| 2013-11-09 || Loss ||align=left|  Pavel Zhuravlev || Legend 2: Invasion, Semi Finals || Moscow, Russia || TKO (punches) || 1 ||  N/A
|-
|-  bgcolor="#FFBBBB"
| 2013-04-20 || Loss || align=left|  Artem Levin || Glory 7: Milan || Milan, Italy || Extension round decision (unanimous) || 4 || 3:00
|-
|-  bgcolor="#c5d2ea"
| 2013-03-09 || Draw ||align=left| César Córdoba || Enfusion Live: Barcelona || Barcelona, Spain || Decision draw || 3 || 3:00
|-  bgcolor="#FFBBBB"
| 2012-12-02 || Loss ||align=left| Franci Grajš || Enfusion 3: Trial of the Gladiators, Semi Finals || Ljubljana, Slovenia || Decision (unanimous) || 3 || 3:00
|-  bgcolor="#CCFFCC"
| 2012-09-15 || Win ||align=left| Jason Wilnis || Iron Ring || Alkmaar, Netherlands || Decision || 3 || 3:00
|-
|-  bgcolor="#CCFFCC"
| 2012-05-12 || Win ||align=left| Andrew Tate || Siam Gym Belgium presents It's Showtime 56 || Kortrijk, Belgium || Decision (unanimous) || 5 || 3:00
|-
! style=background:white colspan=9 |
|-
|-  bgcolor="#CCFFCC"
| 2012-03-10 || Win ||align=left| Toni Milanović || Cro Cop Final Fight || Zagreb, Croatia || Decision (unanimous) || 3 || 3:00
|-  bgcolor="#CCFFCC"
| 2012-01-28 || Win ||align=left| Mourad Bouzidi || It's Showtime 2012 in Leeuwarden || Leeuwarden, Netherlands || Decision (4–1) || 3 || 3:00
|-  bgcolor="#CCFFCC"
| 2012-01-14 || Loss ||align=left| Hakan Aksoy || Fightsensation II || Eindhoven, Netherlands || Decision || 3 || 3:00
|-
|-  bgcolor="CCFFCC"
| 2011-08-17 || Win ||align=left| Eddie Walker || Enfusion 3: Trial of the Gladiators, Quarter Final || Ohrid, Macedonia || KO || 1 || 1:40
|-  bgcolor="CCFFCC"
| 2011-08-12 || Win ||align=left| David Radeff || Enfusion 3: Trial of the Gladiators, First round || Ohrid, Macedonia || Decision || 3 || 3:00
|-  bgcolor="#CCFFCC"
| 2011-06-18 || Win ||align=left| Moises Ruibal || It's Showtime Madrid 2011 || Madrid, Spain || Decision (4–1) || 3 || 3:00
|-
|-  bgcolor="#CCFFCC"
| 2011-05-21 || Win ||align=left| Amir Zeyada || Fightclub presents: It's Showtime 2011 || Amsterdam, Netherlands || Decision (majority) || 5 || 3:00
|-
! style=background:white colspan=9 |
|-
|-  bgcolor="#FFBBBB"
| 2011-01-? || Loss ||align=left| Frank Muñoz || Enfusion Kickboxing Tournament '11, 1st Round || Koh Samui, Thailand || Decision || 3 || 3:00
|-
|-  bgcolor="#CCFFCC"
| 2010-05-15 || Win ||align=left| Yassin Boudrouz || Gala-A Marche-en-Famenne || Marche-en-Famenne, Belgium || KO || 4 ||  N/A
|-
! style=background:white colspan=9 |
|-
|-  bgcolor="#CCFFCC"
| 2011-03-26 || Win ||align=left| Marc Vlieger || BFN Group presents: It's Showtime Brussel || Brussels, Belgium || Decision (4–1) || 3 || 3:00
|-
|-  bgcolor="#FFBBBB"
| 2010-10-29 || Loss ||align=left| Abdarhmane Coulibaly || France vs Lumpinee || Paris, France || Decision || 5 || 3:00
|-
! style=background:white colspan=9 |
|-
|-  bgcolor="#CCFFCC"
| 2010-06-05 || Win ||align=left| Donald Berner || Uitslagen Kumite 11 || Hilversum, Netherlands || Decision || 5 || 3:00
|-
|-  bgcolor="#CCFFCC"
| 2010-04-25 || Win ||align=left| Asim Selimovic || Gala in Schermerhoorn || Schermerhorn, Netherlands || KO (punches) || 2 ||  N/A
|-
|-  bgcolor="#FFBBBB"
| 2009-05-30 || Loss ||align=left| Romeo Almazidis || Bull's Gym Gala Putte || Putte, Netherlands || Decision || 5 || 3:00
|-
|-  bgcolor="#FFBBBB"
| 2009-03-29 || Loss ||align=left| Hicham El Gaoui || The Outland Rumble III || Rotterdam, Netherlands || Decision || 5 || 3:00
|-
|-  bgcolor="#FFBBBB"
| 2008-09-06 || Loss ||align=left| Nicu Dascălu || It's Showtime 2008 Alkmaar || Alkmaar, Netherlands || Decision || 3 || 3:00
|-
|-  bgcolor="#FFBBBB"
| 2007-12-22 || Loss ||align=left| Dave Meijer || Fight For Life || Amsterdam, Netherlands || Decision || 5 || N/A
|-
|-  bgcolor="#CCFFCC"
| 2006-12-02 || Win ||align=left| van Brummel || It's Showtime 2006 Alkmaar || Alkmaar, Netherlands || Decision || 3 || 3:00
|-
|-  bgcolor="#FFBBBB"
| 2005-09-18 || Loss ||align=left| Robin van Tongeren || Gala in Zilvermeeuwen || Zaandam, Netherlands || Decision || 3 || 2:00
|-
|-  bgcolor="#c5d2ea"
| 2004-12-19 || Draw ||align=left| Michael Schrijver || Gala Landsmeer || Landsmeer, Netherlands || Decision draw || 2 || 1:30
|-
|-
| colspan=9 | Legend:

See also
 List of It's Showtime events
 List of It's Showtime champions
 List of male kickboxers

References

External links
 It's Showtime - Official website
 Van Os Gym Hyve - hyves.nl (In Dutch)

1988 births
Living people
Armenian male kickboxers
Dutch male kickboxers
Heavyweight kickboxers
Cruiserweight kickboxers
Armenian emigrants to the Netherlands
Sportspeople from Alkmaar
Glory kickboxers